Yanga Municipality is a municipality located in the southern area of the State of Veracruz, Mexico, about 80 km from the state capital of Xalapa. It was formerly known as San Lorenzo de los Negros (after a colony of cimarrons in the early 17th century) or San Lorenzo de Cerralvo (after a 17th-century Spanish colonial priest). In 1932 it was renamed after Gaspar Yanga, the cimarron leader who in 1609 resisted attack by Spanish forces trying to regain control of the area.

History
Gaspar Yanga was an Punu/Punu chief in present-day Gabon in Central Africa before being sold into slavery and sent to Mexico. As early as Yangah reportedly arrived in Mexico - before 1570 - it is very likely that he shipped by way of the Elmina Castle, the first ever European slave-trading post established on the west coast of Africa (1482). After leading an escape by a band of slaves in 1570, Yanga and his group settled in the highlands. They fought off Spanish forces in 1609, with further bloody skirmishes over nearly a decade.

In 1618 he finally negotiated with Spanish officials to grant freedom to the fugitive slaves and independence to their village, a few kilometers from the city of Cordoba, Veracruz. It became known as San Lorenzo de los Negros (named after the cimmarons) or San Lorenzo de Cerralvo (named after Juan Laurencio, a Jesuit cleric who had accompanied the 1609 expedition sent by the Viceroy). They gave the town of San Lorenzo its "small independence".

The black inhabitants of San Lorenzo proclaimed their loyalty to the Catholic Church and the King of Spain, but refused to pay tribute to the Spanish government.

Geography
The municipality of  Yanga is bordered to the east by Cuitláhuac, to the north-east by Atoyac and to the south-east by Omealca.

Agriculture
It produces principally maize, beans, sugarcane, coffee and mango.

Celebrations
Every February, a festival is held to celebrate Virgen de Candelaria, the patron of the town. Every December is a festival in honour of the Virgin of Guadalupe.

Annually, in mid-August, a carnival is held to celebrate Gaspar Yanga, the former slave and leader who held off the Spanish in their attack of 1609 on his maroon settlement in the highlands. Several years later, in 1618 he gained the founding of a free village and freedom for his band of maroons - recorded as the first free, Black autonomous region in the Americas. The 400th anniversary carnival was held in August 2009, four centuries after the Spanish had attacked the  settlement.

Twinning
Yanga is twinned with the following places:
 Wexford, Ireland. While Yanga's city government has registered its interesting in twinning with Wexford, the local authorities do not have at this moment the authorization to submit any documents without previous authorization from the Irish Consulate.

Climate
The climate in Yanga is warm and humid, with an average temperature of 18 °C and rains mainly in the summer and fall.

References

External links 
  Municipal Official webpage
  Municipal Official Information

Afro-Mexican
Municipalities of Veracruz